Arthur William Dickinson (7 October 1907 – 1976) was an English footballer who played as a right back in the Football League for Darlington. He was on the books of Brighton & Hove Albion without representing them in the league, and played non-league football for Ferryhill Athletic and Folkestone.

Life and career
Arthur William Dickinson was born on 7 October 1907 in Darlington, County Durham. He played football for Northern League club Ferryhill Athletic, where his performances were reported to have attracted interest from clubs including Aston Villa and Grimsby Town of the Football League First Division. In November 1930, when he signed for Third Division South club Brighton & Hove Albion, the Athletic News described him as "a fearless player sound in tackling and quick at recovering".

Dickinson played regularly for Brighton's reserve team in the London Combination, but never appeared for the first team, and moved back into non-league football with Folkestone of the Southern League at the end of the season. Although he helped the team finish second in the Southern League Eastern Section, and the Daily Express reported that he "stood out in the Folkestone defence for fearless work" in the FA Cup defeat to his former club, Brighton & Hove Albion, he was unable to establish himself as a first-team regular and was released.

He returned to the north-east of England and signed for Darlington of the Third Division North. He made his debut in the Football League on 3 December 1932, standing in for regular right back Hughie Dow for the visit to Chester that Darlington lost 5–2. He played twice more in the last two weeks of the 1932–33 season as Darlington finished bottom of the division, but those were his only first-team appearances.

Dickinson died in 1976.

References

Sources
 
 

1907 births
1976 deaths
Footballers from Darlington
English footballers
Association football fullbacks
Ferryhill Athletic F.C. players
Brighton & Hove Albion F.C. players
Folkestone F.C. players
Darlington F.C. players
Northern Football League players
Southern Football League players
English Football League players